Coastal Carolina Chanticleers basketball may refer to either of the basketball teams that represent Coastal Carolina University:
Coastal Carolina Chanticleers men's basketball
Coastal Carolina Chanticleers women's basketball